The Battle of Jellalabad in 1842 was an Afghan siege of the isolated British outpost at Jellalabad (now Jalalabad) about  east of Kabul. The siege was lifted after five months when a British counterattack routed the Afghans, driving them back to Kabul.

Battle 
The outpost was no more than a wide place in the road with a fort, held by about 2,000 troops under General Sir Robert Sale. After the massacre of the British force during their retreat from Kabul in January 1842, Jellallabad was surrounded by Afghan forces, which launched a series of attacks on the force. The British managed to beat off the assaults, and even captured 300 sheep from the besieging force when rations ran short. Eventually, after five months under siege, Sale mounted an attack against the Afghan forces, captured their main camp, baggage, stores, guns, and horses and the Afghans fled to Kabul.

The defence of Jellalabad made heroes of the 13th Foot (later known as the Somerset Light Infantry). It is reported that as the regiment marched back through India to return to Britain, every garrison fired a ten gun salute in its honour. Queen Victoria directed that the regiment be made Light Infantry, carry the additional title of "Prince Albert's Own" and wear a badge depicting the walls of the town with the word “Jellalabad”. The army barracks in Taunton, the county town of Somerset, was named Jellalabad Barracks after the battle and that area of the town is still known as 'Jellalabad'.

W. L. Walton a landscape artist, working in London, who exhibited between 1834 and 1855, made the lithographic plates for General Sale's Defence of Jalalabad (c. 1845).

Order of Battle 
The British order of battle was;

British Army

 13th (1st Somersetshire, Prince Albert's Light Infantry) Regiment of Foot

Bengal Presidency Army

 Squadron from 1st Horse (Skinner's Horse)
 35th Bengal Native Infantry
 Shah Shujah's Sappers
 Artillery troops from the Bengal Field Artillery

Notes
The Free Dictionary by Farlex
www.britishbattles.com

References

Conflicts in 1841
Conflicts in 1842
1841 in Afghanistan
1842 in Afghanistan
Battles of the First Anglo-Afghan War
Battles involving Afghanistan
Sieges involving the United Kingdom
Jalalabad
History of Nangarhar Province
Jellalabad